Fuambai Sia Ahmadu is a Sierra Leonean-American anthropologist. She has worked for UNICEF and the British Medical Research Council in the Gambia.

Ahmadu obtained her PhD in social anthropology from the London School of Economics and undertook post-doctoral work at the Department of Comparative Human Development, University of Chicago.

Ahmadu is known for her work on female circumcision or what opponents refer to as female genital mutilation (FGM) and, in particular, for her decision as an adult and member of the Kono ethnic group to undergo initiation into the female controlled Bundu secret society. Contrary to the position of the World Health Organization, UNICEF and other UN bodies, she has argued that the health risks of most types of female circumcision are exaggerated, its effect on women's sexuality misunderstood, and that most affected women do not experience it as an oppressive practice. Ahmadu's views are shared by several other anthropologists.

Fuambai was interviewed in May 2017 by Tucker Carlson.

Notes

External links
 Personal website

American anthropologists
Female genital mutilation
Medical anthropologists
American women anthropologists
Living people
Mandé people
1960s births
21st-century American women
Alumni of the London School of Economics